Witness for the Prosecution is a 1957 American legal mystery thriller film directed by Billy Wilder and starring Tyrone Power, Marlene Dietrich, Charles Laughton and Elsa Lanchester. The film, which has elements of bleak black comedy and film noir, is a courtroom drama set in the Old Bailey in London and is based on the 1953 play of the same name by Agatha Christie. The first film adaptation of Christie's story, Witness for the Prosecution was adapted for the screen by Larry Marcus, Harry Kurnitz and Wilder. The film received positive reviews and six Academy Award nominations.

Plot
Senior barrister Sir Wilfrid Robarts, who is recovering from a heart attack, agrees to defend Leonard Vole despite the objections of Robarts' private nurse Miss Plimsoll, as Sir Wilfrid's doctor has warned him against taking any criminal cases. Vole is accused of murdering Emily French, a wealthy, childless, older widow who had become enamored of him and had named him as the main beneficiary in her will. Strong circumstantial evidence points to Vole as the killer, but Sir Wilfrid believes Vole to be innocent.

When Sir Wilfrid speaks with Vole's German wife Christine, he finds her rather cold and self-possessed, but she does provide an alibi, although it is not entirely convincing. He is greatly surprised when, during the trial, she is summoned as a witness by the prosecuting barrister.

While a wife cannot be compelled to testify against her husband, Christine was still married to Otto Helm, a German man now living in East Germany in the Russian Zone, when she wed Vole (who was in the Royal Air Force and part of the occupation forces in Germany and had married her to help her escape Germany). She testifies that Vole privately confessed to her that he had killed Mrs. French, and her conscience forced her to finally tell the truth.

During the trial in the Old Bailey, Sir Wilfrid is contacted by a mysterious woman who, for a fee, provides him with letters written by Christine to a mysterious lover named Max. The handwriting is genuine, and the woman has a legitimate reason for providing the letters: her face has been scarred and slashed, supposedly by Max. The letters include an account of Max and Christine's plan to kill Leonard, which convinces the jury that Christine had deliberately perjured herself. Leonard is acquitted, much to the crowd's delight.

However, Sir Wilfrid is troubled by the verdict. He is proved correct when Christine, brought into the courtroom for safety after being assailed by the departing crowd for her conduct, tells him that he had help winning the case. Sir Wilfrid had told her before the trial that any alibi contributed by a loving wife would not be believed by the jury. So she played a hateful, double-crossing wife and proffered testimony implicating her husband, and then forged the letters to the non-existent Max and assumed a disguise to play the mysterious woman who contributed the letters, discrediting her own testimony and leading to the acquittal. She admits that she saved Leonard, although she knew that he was guilty, because she loves him. She accepts that she may be tried for perjury.

Leonard, who has overheard Christine's admission, cheerfully confirms that he indeed killed Mrs. French. Sir Wilfrid is infuriated but helpless to stop Leonard because of double-jeopardy laws (since overturned in the United Kingdom) that would prevent a retrial. Christine is shocked to discover that Leonard has been in an affair with a younger woman for whom he plans to abandon Christine, feeling he and Christine are now even because they have saved each other's lives.

Christine angrily grabs a knife (used earlier as evidence and subtly highlighted by a reflection on Sir Wilfrid's monocle) and kills Leonard. After she is arrested by the police, Sir Wilfrid, urged on by Miss Plimsoll, declares that he will take on Christine's defense.

Cast

Credited

Uncredited

Production
Producers Arthur Hornblow and Edward Small bought the rights to the play for $450,000. The play was adjusted to emphasize the character of the defense barrister. Billy Wilder was signed to direct in April 1956. According to Wilder, when the producers approached Marlene Dietrich about the part, she accepted on the condition that Wilder direct. Wilder said that Dietrich liked "to play a murderess" but was "a little bit embarrassed when playing the love scenes."

O'Connor was the only member of the original Broadway play's cast to reprise her role in the film. Vivien Leigh was considered for the role of Christine Vole. Laughton based his performance on Florance Guedella, his own lawyer, an Englishman who was known for twirling his monocle while cross-examining witnesses.

In a flashback showing how Leonard and Christine first meet in a German nightclub, she is wearing her trademark trousers, made famous by Dietrich in director Josef von Sternberg’s film Morocco (1930). A rowdy customer rips them down one side, revealing one of Dietrich's renowned legs and starting a brawl. The scene required 145 extras, 38 stuntmen and cost $90,000. The bar is called Die blaue Laterne, which is a reference to Dietrich's famous film The Blue Angel.

United Artists' "surprise ending"

At the end of the film, as the credits roll, a voiceover announces:

This was in keeping with the advertising campaign for the film. One of the posters said: "You'll talk about it! - but please don't tell the ending!"

The effort to keep the ending a secret extended to the cast. Billy Wilder did not allow the actors to view the final ten pages of the script until it was time to shoot those scenes. The secrecy reportedly cost Marlene Dietrich an Academy Award, as United Artists did not want to call attention to the fact that Dietrich was practically unrecognizable as the Cockney woman who hands over the incriminating letters to the defense.

Reception
In a contemporary review for The New York Times, critic Bosley Crowther wrote: "... [T]here's never a dull or worthless moment. It's all parry and punch from the word 'Go!', which is plainly announced when the accused man is brought to Mr. Laughton at the beginning of the film. And the air in the courtroom fairly crackles with emotional electricity, until that staggering surprise in the last reel. Then the whole drama explodes. It's the staging of the scenes that is important in this rapidly moving film ... It's the balancing of well-marked characters, the shifts of mood, the changes of pace and the interesting bursts of histrionics that the various actors display."

Agatha Christie "herself considered it the finest film derived from one of her stories." It currently holds a 100% approval rating on Rotten Tomatoes, based on 31 reviews with an average rating of 8.53/10. In TV Guides review of the film, it received four and a half stars out of five, the writer saying that "Witness for the Prosecution is a witty, terse adaptation of the Agatha Christie hit play brought to the screen with ingenuity and vitality by Billy Wilder."

The American Film Institute included the film in AFI's 10 Top 10 at #6 in the courtroom-drama category.

Box Office
The film reached number one at the American box office for two consecutive weeks in February and March 1958.

It earned $3.75 million in its first year.

Accolades

Home media
Witness for the Prosecution was released on DVD by MGM Home Entertainment on December 11, 2001 as a Region 1 widescreen DVD, and by Kino Lorber (under license from MGM) on Blu-ray on July 22, 2014 as a Region 1 widescreen disc.

See also
 List of American films of 1957
 Trial movies

References

Bibliography

External links

 
 
 
 
 
 

1957 films
1950s thriller drama films
American black-and-white films
American legal drama films
American thriller drama films
American courtroom films
1950s English-language films
Films about lawyers
Films based on works by Agatha Christie
Films directed by Billy Wilder
Films featuring a Best Supporting Actress Golden Globe-winning performance
Films set in London
Films set in Hamburg
Films set in 1945
Films set in 1952
1950s legal films
Films with screenplays by Billy Wilder
United Artists films
1957 drama films
1950s American films